Wyaconda River is a stream in Davis County, in the U.S. state of Iowa, and Lewis and Clark counties in Missouri. It is a tributary of the Mississippi River.  It is the third most northeastern stream in Missouri, following the Des Moines River and the Fox River.

The source of both the North and South Forks are near Bloomfield, Iowa. The stream flows to the southeast into Lewis County about 1.5 miles southwest of St. Patrick and Missouri Route 81. The stream continues and turns to the south about one mile west of Canton where it passes under Missouri Route 16. The stream turns to the southeast and runs semi-parallel to US Route 61. It passes under Route 61 and meanders to the southeast to enter the Mississippi just north of La Grange.

Wyaconda is a name derived from the Dakota language meaning "sacred power".

West of Canton, the river has a mean annual discharge of 316 cubic feet per second.

See also
List of rivers of Missouri
List of rivers of Iowa

References

Rivers of Clark County, Missouri
Rivers of Lewis County, Missouri
Rivers of Missouri